The G5RV antenna is a dipole with a symmetric resonant feeder line, which serves as impedance matcher for a 50 Ω coax cable to the transceiver.

Origin
Louis Varney (G5RV) invented this antenna in 1946. It is very popular in the United States. The antenna can be erected as horizontal dipole, as sloper, or an inverted-V antenna. With a transmatch, it can operate on all HF amateur radio bands (3.5–30 MHz).

Impedance
As is in general the case for all electric antennas, the height of the G5RV above the ground should be at least half of the longest wavelength to be used.

The ends of the symmetric feedline can be soldered directly onto a 50 Ω coax cable to the transceiver, however this is not good practice and should be avoided: It can result in high current flow on the outer surface of the coax braid, causing RF interference and degrading the polarization and gain of the antenna. A 1:1 current balun should be used between coax and ladder line. Including a balun not only prevents RF interference but reduces receive noise and increases performance A length of at least  of 50 Ω cable is recommended for operation without a balun.

A transmatch (antenna tuner) is not required to use this antenna near its nominal design frequency of 14 MHz, and judicious length adjustments can sometimes include one other frequency band. All other frequencies require a transmatch. There are many variants of the G5RV antenna. Two variations of the G5RV design, called ZS6BKW and W0BTU, can match several more amateur bands between 3.5–28 MHz without a transmatch.

References 

Antennas